Uyghur nationalism is a nationalist movement which asserts that the Uyghur people, an ethnic minority in China, are a distinct nation. Uyghur nationalism promotes the cultural unity of the Uyghur people, either as an independent group or as a regional group within a larger Chinese nation. 

Uyghurs are mostly concentrated in Xinjiang, a province-level autonomous region located in Western China. They are Turkic-speaking, and most of them adhere to Sunni Islam. They are officially recognized by the Chinese government as one of the "56 flowers". 

Uyghur nationalism is linked to the East Turkestan independence movement, also known as the Uyghur independence movement, which seeks to separate Xinjiang from China and establish self-rule as an independent nation. "East Turkestan" is a common alternative name for Xinjiang used by advocates of independence. "Uyghurstan" is another alternative name.

Uyghur identity

The Uyghurs are a minority Turkic ethnic group originating from and culturally affiliated with the general region of Central Asia and East Asia. They are especially closely connected to the Taklamakan Desert comprising the Tarim Basin, both of which can be found in Xinjiang UAR, China.

Uyghur identity is largely shaped by Uyghur nationalism, and vice versa. Uyghur nationalism is an ideological mindset which is based more strongly in politics in comparison to Uyghur identity. Whereas Uyghur identity is more closely associated with cultural traditions and practices, Uyghur nationalism is more closely associated with the East Turkestan independence movement and other much more assertive expressions of Uyghur identity. The primary counter to Uyghur nationalism is Chinese nationalism, which is actually a form of multi-ethnic nationalism distinct from Han Chinese nationalism (though the two concepts are commonly conflated).

Ethnic ancestry

Like most Central Asian ethnic groups, the Uyghurs are descended from a diverse range of people groups. Uyghur ethnic composition and identity has its origins in many different regions, cultures, and civilizations. The name of the Uyghurs originates from the Uyghur Khaganate, a historical country which was located primarily in what is now Mongolia and Xinjiang.

The Uyghurs are postulated to carry at least some ancestry from various more ancient peoples who inhabited the Taklamakan Desert and Tarim Basin, who are known to have been living in the region for at least 3800 years due to the discovery of "Tarim mummies". Links to ancient inhabitants of the region are contentious since this might grant the modern Uyghurs with the right to claim "indigenous status".

Linguistic identity

Religious identity

Ever since the 10th century CE, the Uyghurs have been gradually Islamized, the religion of Islam having originated from the Arabian Peninsula (Saudi Arabia) and now being dominant across many regions of Western Asia, Central Asia, North Africa, East Africa, maritime Southeast Asia and Southeast Europe. Prior to this, the Uyghurs practiced Buddhism, a religion which originated from South Asia (India and Nepal) and which still remains the dominant religion of the neighboring Tibetan and Mongolian peoples in Western China and Mongolia as well as much of mainland Southeast Asia and Sri Lanka.

Geographic identity
The Uyghur people have formed a strong national identity largely due to their very strong geographic identity. Uyghur identity is closely tied to life in the Taklamakan Desert and the Tarim Basin. The Uyghurs as a people or a nation are held together largely by their distinct lifestyle as sedentary farmers living in several oases scattered across the Taklamakan Desert.

Pan-Turkic nationalism 

Pan-Turkic Jadidists and East Turkestan independence activists Muhammad Amin Bughra and Masud Sabri rejected the imposition of the name "Uyghur people" upon the Turkic people of Xinjiang by the Soviets and Chinese warlord Shen Shicai. They wanted instead the name "Turkic ethnicity" to be applied to their people. Masud Sabri also viewed the Hui people as Muslim Han Chinese, distinct from his own people. The names "Türk" or "Türki" in particular were demanded by Bughra as the real name for his people. He slammed Sheng Shicai for his designation of Turkic Muslims into different ethnicities, which could sow disunion among Turkic Muslims.

During the First East Turkestan Republic, the Turkic nationalist ideology of the Republic led to hostility between different Muslim ethnic groups. The Uyghurs and Kirghiz, who were both Turkic Muslim peoples, fought against the Chinese Muslims of southern Xinjiang and sought to expel them with the Han Chinese. This led several Chinese Muslim Generals like Ma Zhancang, Ma Fuyuan, and Ma Hushan to fight against the Uyghur attempts towards independence.

East Turkestan independence movement
The East Turkestan independence movement, also known as the Xinjiang separatist movement or the Uyghur independence movement, is a political movement that seeks independence for Xinjiang Uyghur Autonomous Region, a large and sparsely-populated national autonomous region of the People's Republic of China (PRC/China) located in the country's northwest, as a homeland for the Uyghur people, who are primarily of Turkic rather than Sinitic (Han Chinese) ethnic extraction. Within the movement, there is widespread support for the region to be renamed, since "Xinjiang" is perceived by independence activists as a colonial name. "East Turkestan" is the most well-known proposed name. "Uyghurstan" is another well-known proposed name.

Responses to Uyghur nationalism

See also
Hui pan-nationalism
Pan-Turkism

References 

Indigenous nationalism
Nationalism in China
Nationalist movements in Asia
Political movements in China
Uyghurs
Xinjiang
East Turkestan independence movement